Scopula asparta  is a moth of the family Geometridae. It was described by Prout in 1938. It is found in India (the Khasi Hills).

References

Moths described in 1938
asparta
Moths of Asia
Taxa named by Louis Beethoven Prout